The Laurence Olivier Award for Best Set Design is an annual award presented by the Society of London Theatre in recognition of achievements in commercial London theatre. The awards were established as the Society of West End Theatre Awards in 1976, and renamed in 1984 in honour of English actor and director Laurence Olivier.

The award originated as a single award for Designer of the Year in 1976 before being renamed as Best Set Design in 1991 with the introduction of awards for Best Costume Design and Best Lighting Design. In 2004, the award for Best Sound Design was introduced.

Winners and nominees

1970s

1980s

1990s

2000s

2010s

2020s

See also
 Drama Desk Award for Outstanding Set Design
 Tony Award for Best Scenic Design

References

External links
 

Set Design